Yancundong station is an interchange station on Fangshan Line and Yanfang Line of the Beijing Subway. It was opened on December 30, 2017.

Station Layout 
The station has elevated dual-island platforms with a cross platform interchange. Fangshan line trains serve the inner platforms whilst Yanfang line trains serve the outer platforms. On one side, terminating Fangshan line trains interchange with Yanfang line trains heading to Yanshan, whilst on the other, terminating Yanfang line trains interchange with Fangshan line trains heading to Dongguantou South.

Exits 
There are 4 exits, lettered A1, A2, B1, and B2. Exits A2 and B2 are accessible.

References 

Beijing Subway stations in Fangshan District